José Antonio Redondo may refer to:

José Antonio Redondo (cyclist)
José Antonio Redondo (footballer)